Epipyrops atra is a moth in the Epipyropidae family. It was described by Pagenstecher in 1900. It is found on the Bismarck Islands.

References

Moths described in 1900
Epipyropidae